Duck Season may refer to:

 Duck Season (song), a 2002 song by DJ Babu
 Temporada de patos, known in English as Duck Season, a 2004 Mexican film
 A 2017 VR horror game loosely based off of the game Duck Hunt.

See also
 Waterfowl hunting